The Restoration of the monarchy began in 1660 when the English, Scottish and Irish monarchies were all restored under Charles II after the republic that followed the Wars of the Three Kingdoms.  The term Restoration may apply both to the actual event by which the monarchy was restored, and to the period immediately following the event.

Caribbean
Barbados, as a haven for refugees fleeing the English republic, had held for Charles II under Lord Willoughby until defeated by George Ayscue. When news reached Barbados of the King's restoration Thomas Modyford declared Barbados for the King in July 1660. The planters however were not eager for the return of the former governor Lord Willoughby fearing disputes over titles but the King ordered he be restored.

Jamaica had been a conquest of Oliver Cromwell's and Charles II's claim to the island was therefore questionable. However, Charles II chose not to restore Jamaica to Spain and in 1661 it became a British colony and the planters would claim that they held rights as Englishmen by the King's assumption of the dominion of Jamaica.  The first governor was Lord Windsor. He was replaced in 1664 by Thomas Modyford who had been ousted from Barbados.

North America
New England, with its Puritan settlement, had supported the Commonwealth and the Protectorate. Acceptance of the Restoration was reluctant in some quarters as it highlighted the failure of Puritan reform. Rhode Island declared loyalty to the Crown first in October 1660 and Massachusetts lastly in August 1661. New Haven provided refuge for Regicides such as Edward Whalley, William Goffe and John Dixwell and would be subsequently merged into Connecticut in 1662, perhaps in punishment.  John Winthrop, a former governor of Connecticut, and one of whose sons had been a captain in Monck's army, went to England at the Restoration and in 1662 obtained a Royal Charter for Connecticut with New Haven annexed to it.

Maryland had resisted the republic until finally occupied by New England Puritans/Parliamentary forces after the Battle of the Severn in 1655. In 1660 the Governor Josias Fendall tried to turn Maryland into a Commonwealth of its own in what is known as Fendall's Rebellion but with the fall of the republic in England he was left without support and was replaced by Philip Calvert upon the Restoration.

Virginia was the most loyal of King Charles II's dominions. It had according to the eighteenth century historian Robert Beverley, Jr. been "the last of all the King's Dominions that submitted to the Usurpation". Virginia had provided sanctuary for Cavaliers fleeing the English republic. Sir William Berkeley, who had previously been governor up until 1652, was elected governor in 1660 by the House of Burgesses and he promptly declared for the King. The Anglican Church was restored as the established church.

In 1663 the Province of Carolina was formed as a reward given to some supporters of the Restoration. The province was named after the King, Charles II.

References

Former English colonies
History of the Caribbean
History of the Thirteen Colonies
1660s in the Thirteen Colonies
North America in the English Civil War
Colonial United States (British)
Colonies